Stormont (also known as Civil Service Cricket Club) is an international and first-class cricket ground in Belfast, Northern Ireland. It is situated in the grounds of the Stormont Estate, the seat of government in Northern Ireland, and is the home of Civil Service North of Ireland Cricket Club.

International cricket
It is one of four ODI grounds in Ireland (the others being the Bready in Magheramason and Clontarf and Malahide in Dublin). The ground was established in 1949 and saw its first ODI in June 2006: the inaugural ODI match for the Irish cricket team, against England.

In 2007, a three-match ODI series between India and South Africa was played at this ground, and in 2008 it hosted the qualifying tournament for the ICC World Twenty20.

It was selected as a venue to host matches in the 2015 ICC World Twenty20 Qualifier tournament.

International centuries
Seven ODI centuries have been scored at the venue.

International five-wicket hauls

One Day Internationals

Twenty20 Internationals

References

External links
 Ground profile from Cricinfo

Cricket grounds in Northern Ireland
Sports venues in Belfast
Sports venues in County Down
Sports venues completed in 1949